The women's 4 × 100 metres relay sprint competition of the athletics events at the 2015 Pan American Games will take place between the 24 and 25 of July at the CIBC Pan Am and Parapan Am Athletics Stadium. The defending Pan American Games champions are Ana Cláudia Silva, Vanda Gomes, Franciela Krasucki and Rosângela Santos of Brazil.

Records
Prior to this competition, the existing world and Pan American Games records were as follows:

Qualification

Each National Olympic Committee (NOC) ranked in the world's top 16 was able to enter one team.

Schedule

Results
All times shown are in seconds.

Semifinals

Final

References

Athletics at the 2015 Pan American Games
2015
2015 in women's athletics